is a Japanese manga series created by Kazuo Koike and Go Nagai. It was originally published in Shueisha's Weekly Young Jump from 1979-06-07 to the issue of 1982-01-07/14. An OVA based on the manga was released in 1992 by Nippon Crown and it would later be released in the United States by ADV Films, in Italy by Dynamic Italia and in Spain by Manga Films.

Characters

External links
Hanappe Bazooka (manga)  at the World of Go Nagai webpage
Hanappe Bazooka (manga)  at d/visual

Hanappe Bazooka (OVA)  at allcinema

1979 manga
1992 anime OVAs
Go Nagai
Shueisha manga
Shueisha franchises
Kazuo Koike
Seinen manga